The Doctor of Music degree (DMus, DM, MusD or occasionally MusDoc) is a higher doctorate awarded on the basis of a substantial portfolio of compositions and/or scholarly publications on music. Like other higher doctorates, it is granted by universities in the United Kingdom, Ireland and some Commonwealth countries. Most universities restrict candidature to their own graduates or staff, which is a reversal of the practice in former times, when (unlike higher degrees in other faculties) candidates for the degree were not required to be a Master of Arts.

The Doctor of Music degree should not be confused with the Doctor of Musical Arts (DMA) degree, which is the standard (PhD-level) doctorate in fields such as performance (including conducting) and musical composition. (However, at least one graduate program, at the Indiana University Jacobs School of Music, has been issuing the Doctor of Music degree (abbreviated by this institution as "D.M.") since 1953. Notably, many of the Indiana DM degrees are recorded as being in "Music Literature and Performance", rather than just "Performance" presumably differentiating them from the DMA degrees offered elsewhere. )

The D.Mus. is also distinct from the Doctor of Philosophy (PhD) degree in music, which is awarded in areas such as music history, music theory, and musicology.

The Doctor of Music degree has also been awarded honoris causa when presented to musicians and composers such as: Joseph Haydn, Richard Strauss, Pyotr Ilyich Tchaikovsky, Franz Liszt, Johannes Brahms, Felix Mendelssohn, Sir Simon Rattle in classical music, and Joan Baez, Matthew Bellamy, David Bowie, Phil Collins, Bruce Dickinson, Celine Dion, Irene Dunne, Bob Dylan, Kenny Garrett, Sir Barry Gibb, Robin Gibb, David Gilmour, Barbara Hendrix, Milt Hinton, Billy Joel, Nik Kershaw, Sir Elton John, B.B. King, Mark Knopfler, Annie Lennox, Jon Lord, Sir Paul McCartney, Joni Mitchell, Sir Van Morrison, Jimmy Page, Paul Simon, Joe Walsh, Brian Wilson, Stevie Wonder and Neil Young in popular music. It has also been awarded as an honorary degree to musical artists who were not composers, including the ballet dancers Dame Alicia Markova and Dame Beryl Grey, as well as female royalty regardless of their experience in music.

See also
 Doctor of Musical Arts (DMA)

References

Musical Arts, Doctor of